Mallory Burdette was the defending champion, having won the event in 2012, but she decided to participate at the 2013 Southern California Open instead.

Johanna Konta won the tournament, defeating Sharon Fichman in the final, 6–4, 6–2.

Seeds

Main draw

Finals

Top half

Bottom half

References 
 Main draw

Odlum Brown Vancouver Open
Vancouver Open